Shooting sports at the 1954 Asian Games was held in Manila, Philippines between 3 and 7 May 1954. Shooting comprised 6 events, all open to both men and women.

There were two pistol events, three rifle events and trap as a shotgun event in the program.

Medalists

Medal table

References 

 ISSF Results Overview

External links
Asian Shooting Federation

 
1954 Asian Games events
1954
Asian Games
Shooting competitions in the Philippines